Paul James Raynor (born 29 April 1966) is an English former professional footballer who played as a midfielder. He has worked as assistant manager under Steve Evans at Rotherham United, Leeds United, Mansfield Town, Peterborough United and Gillingham, and is currently at Stevenage.

Career
He played in the Football League for Nottingham Forest, Bristol Rovers, 
Huddersfield Town, 
Swansea City, Wrexham, 
Cambridge United, 
Preston North End (where he briefly played alongside a young David Beckham), and 
Leyton Orient.  He also spent a year in the Chinese Jia-A League with Guangdong Hongyuan.

After leaving Leyton Orient, Raynor moved into non-league football with clubs including Kettering Town, Ilkeston Town, Boston United, 
King's Lynn, Hednesford Town, where he spent a few months as player-manager, 
Gainsborough Trinity, 
Ossett Albion, and then King's Lynn again, to be released at the end of the 2002–03 season, only to rejoin for the next.

Coaching career
Raynor has coached at clubs Sheffield United and Boston United, where he was assistant manager for a time to Steve Evans. In May 2007 Evans and Raynor left Boston to take over as manager and assistant at Crawley Town, where he occasionally appeared as a player in the Conference.  The pair subsequently moved to Rotherham United. On 28 September 2015, Raynor left Rotherham.  On 19 October 2015, Raynor joined fellow Championship side Leeds United, once again as assistant to Evans. On 31 May 2016, Evans and Raynor were both sacked by Leeds owner Massimo Cellino, with Evans becoming the sixth manager sacked by Cellino in two years.

In June 2019 Raynor linked up with Evans once again at Gillingham.  Both departed the club on 9 January 2022.

References

External links

 

1966 births
Living people
Footballers from Nottingham
English footballers
Association football midfielders
Nottingham Forest F.C. players
Bristol Rovers F.C. players
Huddersfield Town A.F.C. players
Swansea City A.F.C. players
Wrexham A.F.C. players
Cambridge United F.C. players
Preston North End F.C. players
Leyton Orient F.C. players
Guangdong Winnerway F.C. players
Kettering Town F.C. players
Ilkeston Town F.C. (1945) players
Boston United F.C. players
King's Lynn F.C. players
Hednesford Town F.C. players
Gainsborough Trinity F.C. players
Ossett Albion A.F.C. players
Crawley Town F.C. players
English Football League players
China League One players
National League (English football) players
English football managers
Hednesford Town F.C. managers
Sheffield United F.C. non-playing staff
Boston United F.C. non-playing staff
Crawley Town F.C. non-playing staff
Rotherham United F.C. non-playing staff
Leeds United F.C. non-playing staff
Mansfield Town F.C. non-playing staff
Peterborough United F.C. non-playing staff
Gillingham F.C. non-playing staff
British expatriates in China
Expatriate footballers in China